Wimpole Street is a street in Marylebone, central London. Located in the City of Westminster, it is associated with private medical practice and medical associations. No. 1 Wimpole Street is an example of Edwardian baroque architecture, completed in 1912 by architect John Belcher as the home of the Royal Society of Medicine. 64 Wimpole Street is the headquarters of the British Dental Association.

Wimpole Street was home to a few celebrities, such as Paul McCartney who lived at the home of the Asher family at 57 Wimpole Street in 1964–1966 during his relationship with Jane Asher. At this address John Lennon and Paul McCartney wrote "I Want to Hold Your Hand" in the front basement room, while McCartney wrote the tune to "Yesterday" in a box room at the top of the house. 

On the corner of Wimpole and Wigmore Street took place a legal case about causing a "nuisance" between neighbours, in Sturges v Bridgman (1879).

In 1932, Paul Abbatt and Marjorie Abbatt opened a toy shop, Paul & Marjorie Abbatt Ltd, designed by their friend, the architect Ernő Goldfinger, at 94 Wimpole Street. The shop was unique in that children were allowed to touch and play with the displayed toys.

Notable residents 

 Jane Asher, No. 57
 Evelyn Baring, 1st Earl of Cromer, No. 36
 Sir Thomas Barlow, physician to Queen Victoria, No. 10
 Charles-Édouard Brown-Séquard. No. 82
 Elizabeth Barrett Browning, No. 50
 Wilkie Collins, No. 82
 Ethel Gordon Fenwick, No. 20
 Sir Henry Goldfinch, No. 11
 Henry Hallam, No. 67
 Edward James and Tilly Losch, No. 35
 Sir William Milbourne James, Judge of the Court of Appeal in Chancery and the Judicial Committee of the Privy Council, No. 47
 Sir Paul McCartney, No. 57
James Samuel Risien Russell, Guyanese-British physician, neurologist, No 44
 Sir Henry Thompson and his wife, pianist and composer Kate Loder, No 35
 Sir Frederick Treves, 1st Baronet, No. 6
David Rowlands (surgeon), No. 57
 Octavius Wigram
 Sir Robert Walter Carden, 1st Baronet, No. 64

Fictional residents
 Henry Higgins (Pygmalion and My Fair Lady), No. 27a
 James & Maria (Bertram) Rushworth (Mansfield Park, by Jane Austen)

In popular culture

The most famous resident was the poet Elizabeth Barrett, who lived at 50 Wimpole Street with her family from 1838 until 1846 when she eloped with Robert Browning. The street became famous from the play based on their courtship, The Barretts of Wimpole Street. The play starred Katharine Cornell, and when she retired, she moved to E. 51st St. in New York. As she was now neighbour to two other actors who also starred in the play, the street was nicknamed "Wimpole Street".

The first complete English performance of Brahms' Ein deutsches Requiem was performed on 10 July 1871 at 35 Wimpole Street, the private residence (from 1851) of the composer and pianist Kate Loder. The arrangement, which came to be known as "the London version", was for piano duet (played by Loder and Cipriani Potter) with soloists and choir. Around 30 voices were used in the performance.

Virginia Woolf memorably describes Wimpole Street in Flush: A Biography, beginning: "It is the most august of London streets, the most impersonal. Indeed, when the world seems tumbling to ruin, and civilisation rocks on its foundations, one has only to go to Wimpole Street...".

The street was also given as the address of Henry Higgins by Bernard Shaw in his play Pygmalion and in the musical adaptation My Fair Lady, 27a is given as the address. 22a Wimpole Street is referenced in the Monty Python sketch 'Secret Service Dentists'.

See also
 Wimpole House
 Wimpole Mews, an adjoining road famous for its links with the Profumo affair
 Harley Street, also associated with private medicine
 Healthcare in London

References

Streets in the City of Westminster
Health in the City of Westminster
History of medicine
Medical districts